The Mugwumps were Republican political activists in the United States who were intensely opposed to political corruption. They were never formally organized.  Typically they switched parties from the Republican Party by supporting Democratic candidate Grover Cleveland in the presidential election of 1884. They switched because they rejected the long history of corruption associated with Republican candidate James G. Blaine. In a close election, the Mugwumps claimed they made the difference in New York State and swung the election to Cleveland. The jocular word "mugwump", noted as early as 1832, is from Algonquian mugquomp, "important person, kingpin" (from mugumquomp, "war leader"), implying that Mugwumps were "sanctimonious" or "holier-than-thou" in holding themselves aloof from party politics.

After the election, "mugwump" survived for more than a decade as an epithet for a party bolter in American politics. Many Mugwumps became Democrats or remained independents, and most continued to support reform well into the 20th century. During the Third Party System, party loyalty was in high regard, and independents were rare. Theodore Roosevelt stunned his upper-class New York City friends by supporting Blaine in 1884; by rejecting the Mugwumps, he kept alive his Republican Party leadership, clearing the way for his own political aspirations.

New England and the Northeast had been a stronghold of the Republican Party since the Civil War era, but the Mugwumps considered Blaine to be an untrustworthy and fraudulent candidate. Their idealism and reform sensibilities led them to oppose the corruption in the politics of the Gilded Age.

Patronage and politics 

Political patronage, also known as the spoils system, was the issue that angered many reform-minded Republicans, leading them to reject Blaine's candidacy. In the spoils system, the winning candidate would dole out government positions to those who had supported his political party prior to the election. Although the Pendleton Act of 1883 established the United States Civil Service Commission and made competency and merit the base qualifications for government positions, its effective implementation was slow. Political affiliation continued to be the basis for appointment to many positions.

In the early 1880s, the issue of political patronage split the Republican Party down the middle for several consecutive sessions of Congress. The party was divided into two warring factions, each with creative names. The side that held the upper hand in numbers and popular support were the Half-Breeds, led by Senator James Blaine of Maine. The Half-Breeds supported civil service reform and often blocked legislation and political appointments put forth by their main congressional opponents, the Stalwarts, led by Roscoe Conkling of New York.

Blaine was from the reform wing of his own party, but the Mugwumps rejected his candidacy. This division among Republicans may have contributed to the victory in 1884 of Grover Cleveland, the first President elected from the Democratic party since the Civil War. In the period from 1874 to 1894, presidential elections were closely contested at the national level, but the states themselves were mostly dominated by a single party, with Democrats prevailing in the South and the Republicans in the Northeast. Although the defection of the Mugwumps may have helped Cleveland win in New York, one of the few closely contested states, historians attribute Cleveland's victory nationwide to the rising power of urban immigrant voters.

Policies and laws
In Massachusetts, Mugwumps were led by Richard Henry Dana III, (1851–1931), the editor of the Civil Service Record. They took credit for passing the state's 1884 civil service law, which was a stronger version of the federal Pendleton Act of 1883. Both laws were enacted to limit the effect of political patronage, thus disrupting the spoils system. The goals were improved morality and increased efficiency. The 1884 law was also designed to contain the rising political power of the Irish Catholics.

James C. Carter  (1827–1905) was a leading New York lawyer and an influential legal theorist among fellow Mugwumps. Carter distrusted politicians and elected officials. Instead he put his trust in disinterested experts, especially judges. He equated common law with custom, and his condemnation of legislation inconsistent with custom, reflected his Mugwumpism. He tried to synthesize traditional thinking with modernity.  For example, Carter clung to support for active government intervention he learned from the antebellum Whigs, but he more and more embraced antigovernment positions typical of antebellum Jacksonians. He tried to synthesize traditional faith in timeless, objective moral principles with a more modern vision of evolving customary norms. Given growing problems of industrial urban society he saw the need for positive government but wanted judges to rule not politicians.

A new class of experts needed new modes of training, and those were provided by the new American graduate schools, built along German models. A leading organizer was the German-trained scholar Herbert Baxter Adams (1850-1901), head of the history and political science department at the Johns Hopkins University 1882–1901. He promoted mugwump reform at Hopkins and nationally. Under his direction, the faculty and advanced students worked for numerous reforms, including civil service reform in the Pendleton Act (1883), municipal reform with the New Charter of Baltimore (1895), the training of professional social workers, and efforts to solve labor unrest. Raymond Cunningham, argues that his reformism shows that the Mugwumps movement could attract affirmative and optimistic experts, rather than just suspicious or cautious patricians.

In Chicago the Mugwump reformers worked through the Citizens' Association of Chicago, the Chicago Civic Federation, and the Municipal Voters' League. They opposed corruption, government subsidies, high taxes, and public enterprise. However they also wanted government to solve the problems of the rapidly growing metropolis. This was only possible if the voters were better informed. The newspapers adopted Mugwumpery as a way of building support for municipal reform among working-class voters in the two decades after the 1871 fire. The key leader was Joseph Medill, owner and editor of the Chicago Tribune.

Historical appraisals 

Several historians of the 1950s through 1970s portrayed the Mugwumps as members of an insecure elite, one that felt threatened by changes in American society. These historians often focused on the social background and status of their subjects and the narratives they have written share a common outlook.

Mugwumps tended to come from old Protestant families of New York and New England and often from inherited wealth. They belonged to or identified with the emerging business and professional elite and were often members of the most exclusive clubs. Yet they felt threatened by the rise of machine politics, one aspect of which was the spoils system; and by the rising power of both immigrants and of multi-millionaires in American society. They excelled as authors and essayists, yet their writings indicated their social position and class loyalties. In politics, they tended to be ineffectual and unsuccessful, unable and unwilling to operate effectively in a political environment where patronage was the norm.

In his 1998 work, historian David Tucker attempts to rehabilitate the Mugwumps. According to Tucker, the Mugwumps embodied the liberalism of the 19th century and their rejection by 20th-century historians, who embraced the government intervention of the New Deal and the Great Society, is not surprising. To Tucker, their eloquent writings speak for themselves and are testament to a high minded civic morality.

During the 2017 United Kingdom general election, Conservative Foreign Secretary Boris Johnson by writing in The Sun accused Labour Party Leader Jeremy Corbyn of being a threat to the United Kingdom and described him as a "mutton-headed old mugwump".

Etymology 
Dictionaries report that "mugguomp" is an Algonquian word  meaning "person of importance" or "war leader". Charles Anderson Dana, the colorful newspaperman and editor of the now-defunct New York Sun, is said to have given the Mugwumps their political moniker. Dana made the term plural and derided them as amateurs and public moralists.

During the 1884 campaign, they were often portrayed as "fence-sitters", with part of their body on the side of the Democrats and the other on the side of the Republicans. Their "mug" on one side of the fence, and their "wump" (comic mispronunciation of "rump") on the other. Angry Republicans like Roscoe Conkling sometimes hinted they were homosexual, calling them "man milliners".

The epithet "goody-goody" from the 1890s goo-goo, a corruption of "good government", was used in a similar derogatory manner. Whereas "mugwump" has become an obscure and almost forgotten political moniker, "goo-goo" was revived, especially in Chicago, by the political columns of Mike Royko.

Notable Mugwumps 
Charles Francis Adams Jr., president of the Union Pacific Railroad and the American Historical Association
 Henry Adams, author
 Edward Atkinson, entrepreneur and business executive
 Louis Brandeis, future Supreme Court Justice
 Charles William Eliot, President of Harvard University
 Josiah Willard Gibbs, professor of physics at Yale University
 E.L. Godkin, editor of The Nation
 Seth Low, Republican mayor of Brooklyn in 1884 who lost his party's support due to his backing Cleveland.
 Joseph Medill, owner and editor of the Chicago Tribune.
 Thomas Nast, political cartoonist
 Carl Schurz, former Senator from Missouri and Secretary of the Interior as well as editor of the Saturday Evening Post
 Moorfield Storey, lawyer and NAACP president from 1909 to 1915.
 William Graham Sumner, social scientist, Yale University
 Mark Twain, author self-identified as a Mugwump in his essay Christian Science
 Horace White, editor of the Chicago Tribune
Dogan Levine, prominent Jewish rabbi
Molin Cesser, famous Irish pianist

See also 
 Goo-goos
 U.S. Civil Service Reform

References

Notes

Bibliography 
 Blodgett, Geoffrey T. (1966). The Gentle Reformers: Massachusetts Democrats in the Cleveland Era. Harvard University Press. online
 Blodgett, Geoffrey T. "The Mind of the Boston Mugwump," The Mississippi Valley Historical Review, Vol. 48, No. 4. (Mar. 1962), pp. 614–634. JSTOR.
 Butler, Leslie. Critical Americans: Victorian Intellectuals and Transatlantic Liberal Reform (2009), a major recent study
 Cunningham, Raymond. "'Scientia Pro Patria': Herbert Baxter Adams and Mugwump Academic Reform at Johns Hopkins, 1876-1901." Prospects (1990), Vol. 15, pp 109–144. 
 Grossman, Lewis A. "James Coolidge Carter and Mugwump Jurisprudence." Law and History Review 20.3 (2002): 577–629. online
 Hofstadter, Richard (1956). The Age of Reform. (New York: Vintage Books).
 Hoogenboom, Ari (1961). Outlawing the Spoils: A History of the Civil Service Reform Movement, 1865–1883 (1982). . online
 McCord, Kay Moser. "Mark Twain's Participation in Presidential Politics." American Literary Realism, 1870-1910 (1983): 262–271. online
 McFarland, Gerald W. Mugwumps, Morals and Politics, 1884–1920 (1975). . .
 McFarland, Gerald W., ed. Moralists or Pragmatists?, The Mugwumps, 1884–1900 (1975). . .
 Miller, Edward H. "They Vote Only for the Spoils: Massachusetts Reformers, Suffrage Restriction, and the 1884 Civil Service Law." Journal of the Gilded Age and Progressive Era (2009): 341-363 online.
 Nevins, Allan (1932). Grover Cleveland: A Study in Courage, the Democrat whom Mugwumps supported online
 Muzzey, David Saville. James G. Blaine: A Political Idol of Other Days (1934), the Mugwumps' great enemy online.
 Poteat, R. Matthew (2006). "Mugwumps" in the Encyclopedia of American political parties and elections (by Larry Sabato, Howard R. Ernst), p. 233. .
 Sperber, Hans. and Travis Trittschuh. American Political Terms: An Historical Dictionary (1962), pp. 276–77.
 Sproat, John G. (1968). The Best Men: Liberal Reformers in the Gilded Age (1982). .
 Summers, Mark Wahlgren (2000). Rum, Romanism, and Rebellion: The Making of a President, 1884. (University of North Carolina Press).
 Summers, Mark Wahlgren (2004). Party Games: Getting, Keeping, and Using Power in Gilded Age Politics (University of North Carolina Press).
 Thomas, Samuel J. (2004) "Mugwump cartoonists, the papacy, and Tammany Hall in America's gilded age." Religion and American Culture 14.2 (2004): 213–250. online
 Thomas, Samuel J. (2001) "Holding the Tiger: Mugwump Cartoonists and Tammany Hall in Gilded Age New York." New York History (2001): 155–182. online
 Tucker, David M. (1998). Mugwumps: Public Moralists of the Gilded Age. (University of Missouri Press). .
 White, Richard. (2017). The Republic for Which It Stands: The United States During Reconstruction and the Gilded Age, 1865-1896 (Oxford University Press).

External links 

 
 

Political history of the United States
Political party factions in the United States
Republican Party (United States) terminology
1884 in American politics
Defunct American political movements
Party switching
Political terminology of the United States
Classical liberalism
Liberalism in the United States
Civil service reform in the United States